The Norwegian Union of Bricklayers (NMF) was a trade union representing masons in Norway.

The union was founded on 1 May 1900, and soon affiliated to the Norwegian Confederation of Trade Unions.  It had 2,354 members by 1923, and 5,023 in 1963.

In 1976, the union merged into the Norwegian Union of Building Industry Workers.

Presidents
1902: Sverre Iversen
1911: Aksel Schultz
1940s: Lorang Kristiansen

References

Defunct trade unions of Norway
Norwegian Confederation of Trade Unions
Trade unions established in 1900
Trade unions disestablished in 1976
Bricklayers' trade unions